Fabrice Correia (born March 15, 1979, in Le Creusot) is a French football coach and retired professional football player. Currently, he works as a youth coach for Montceau Bourgogne.

He played at the professional level in Ligue 2 for FC Gueugnon, AS Beauvais Oise and ES Wasquehal.

References

1979 births
Living people
French footballers
Ligue 2 players
FC Gueugnon players
AS Beauvais Oise players
Wasquehal Football players
FC Montceau Bourgogne players
Sportspeople from Le Creusot
Association football defenders
Footballers from Bourgogne-Franche-Comté